Zhang Yan (born 30 March 1997) is a Chinese professional footballer currently playing for Chinese Super League club Chengdu Rongcheng as a goalkeeper.

Club career
Zhang Yan would start his professional career when he was promoted to the senior team of Beijing Guoan during the 2016 Chinese Super League season. After spending several seasons with the club he transferred to Jiangsu Suning on 13 July 2018. On 25 March 2019 Zhang would make his debut when he came on as a substitute for Gu Chao in a league game against Hebei China Fortune F.C. in a 3–2 defeat. He would be the clubs second choice goalkeeper as the club won the their first league title, however on 28 February 2021, the parent company Suning Holdings Group announced that operations were going to cease immediately alongside the women and youth teams due to financial difficulties.

On 8 April 2021, Zhang joined second-tier club Chengdu Rongcheng on a free transfer. He made his debut for the club in a league game on 20 May 2021 against Jiangxi Beidamen in a 2–0 defeat. He would fight for the goalkeeping position with Zhang Yinuo and aid the team to promotion to the top tier at the end of the 2021 league campaign.

Career statistics

Honours

Club
Jiangsu Suning
Chinese Super League: 2020

References

External links

1997 births
Living people
Chinese footballers
China youth international footballers
Association football goalkeepers
Chinese Super League players
Beijing Guoan F.C. players
Jiangsu F.C. players